Phillips's mouse (Mus phillipsi) is a species of rodent in the family Muridae.
It is found only in India.
Its natural habitats are subtropical or tropical dry forests, subtropical or tropical dry lowland grassland, and hot deserts.
It is threatened by habitat loss.

References

Mus (rodent)
Rodents of India
Mammals described in 1912
Taxonomy articles created by Polbot